G.I. Joe is a series of American military science fiction action films based on the toy line of the same name. Development for the first film began in 2003, but when the United States launched the invasion of Iraq in March 2003, Hasbro suggested adapting the Transformers instead. In 2009, the first film was released, G.I. Joe: The Rise of Cobra. A second film, G.I. Joe: Retaliation, was released in 2013. A third film, centered on Snake Eyes titled Snake Eyes: G.I. Joe Origins, also serving as a reboot of the series, was released in 2021, and a fourth film, G.I. Joe: Ever Vigilant, is confirmed to be in active development. A crossover film with the Transformers film series is also being developed.

Films

Original series

G.I. Joe: The Rise of Cobra (2009) 

The first film in the series, released on August 7, 2009. It grossed $302 million worldwide. It was directed by Stephen Sommers from a screenplay by Stuart Beattie, David Elliot, and Paul Lovett and a story by Michael B. Gordon, Beattie, and Sommers.

In 1994, Larry Kasanoff and his production company, Threshold Entertainment, had held the rights to do a live-action G.I. Joe film with Warner Bros. as the distributor. Instead they chose to concentrate their efforts on their Mortal Kombat films. As late as 1999, there had been rumors that a film from Threshold Entertainment was still a possibility, but that project was canceled.

In 2003, Lorenzo di Bonaventura was interested in making a film about advanced military technology; Hasbro's Brian Goldner called him and suggested to base the film on the G.I. Joe toy line. Goldner and Bonaventura worked together before, creating toy lines for films Bonaventura produced as CEO of Warner Bros. Goldner and Bonaventura spent three months working out a story, and chose Michael B. Gordon as screenwriter, because they liked his script for 300. Bonaventura wanted to depict the origin story of certain characters, and introduced the new character of Rex, to allow an exploration of Duke. Rex's name came from Hasbro. Beforehand, Don Murphy was interested in filming the property, but when the Iraq War broke out, he considered the subject matter inappropriate, and chose to develop Transformers (another Hasbro toy line) instead. Bonaventura felt, "What [the Joes] stand for, and what Duke stands for specifically in the movie, is something that I'd like to think a worldwide audience might connect with."

By February 2005, Paul Lovett and David Elliot, who wrote Bonaventura's Four Brothers, were rewriting Gordon's draft. In their script, the Rex character is corrupted and mutated into the Cobra Commander, whom Destro needs to lead an army of supersoldiers. Skip Woods was rewriting the script by March 2007, and he added the Alex Mann character from the British Action Man toy line. Bonaventura explained, "Unfortunately, our president has put us in a position internationally where it would be very difficult to release a movie called G.I. Joe. To add one character to the mix is sort of a fun thing to do." The script was leaked online by El Mayimbe of Latino Review, who revealed Woods had dropped the Cobra Organization in favor of the Naja / Ryan, a crooked CIA agent. In this draft, Scarlett is married to Action Man but still has feelings for Duke, and is killed by the Baroness. Snake Eyes speaks, but his vocal cords are slashed during the story, rendering him mute. Mayimbe suggested Stuart Beattie rewrite the script. Fan response to the film following the script review was negative. Bonaventura promised with subsequent rewrites, "I'm hoping we're going to get it right this time." He admitted he had problems with Cobra, concurring with an interviewer "they were probably the stupidest evil organization out there [as depicted in the cartoon]". Hasbro promised to write Cobra back into the script.

In August 2007, Paramount Pictures hired Stephen Sommers to direct the film after his presentation to CEO Brad Grey and production prexy Brad Weston was well received. Sommers had been inspired to explore the G.I. Joe universe after visiting Hasbro's headquarters in Rhode Island. The project had found the momentum based on the success of Transformers, which Bonaventura produced with Murphy. Sommers partly signed on to direct because the concept reminded him of James Bond, and he described an underwater battle in the story as a tribute to Thunderball. Stuart Beattie was hired to write a new script for Sommers's film, and G.I. Joe comic and filecard writer Larry Hama was hired as creative consultant. Hama helped them change story elements that fans would have disliked and made it closer to the comics, ultimately deciding fans would enjoy the script. He persuaded them to drop a comic scene at the film's end, where Snake Eyes speaks. To speed up production before the 2007–2008 Writers Guild of America strike, John Lee Hancock, Brian Koppelman and David Levien also assisted in writing various scenes. Goldner said their inspiration was generally Hama's comics and not the cartoon. Sommers said had it not been for the rich backstory in the franchise, the film would have fallen behind schedule because of the strike.

After Variety had reported that G.I. Joe became a Brussels-based outfit that stands for Global Integrated Joint Operating Entity, there were reports of outrages over Paramount's alleged attempt to change the origin of G.I. Joe Team. Hasbro responded on its G.I. Joe website claiming it was not changing what the G.I. Joe brand is about, and the name "G.I. Joe" will always be synonymous with bravery and heroism. Instead, it would be a modern telling of the "G.I. Joe vs. Cobra" storyline, based out of the "Pit" as they were throughout the 1980s comic book series.

G.I. Joe: Retaliation (2013) 

The second film in the series, released on March 28, 2013, in 3D and IMAX 3D. It grossed $375 million worldwide. It was directed by Jon M. Chu from a screenplay written by Rhett Reese, and Paul Wernick.

For the second film, after the financially successful release of The Rise of Cobra, Rob Moore, the studio vice chairman of Paramount Pictures, stated in 2009 that a sequel would be developed. In January 2011, Rhett Reese and Paul Wernick, the writers of Zombieland, were hired to write the script for the sequel. The film was originally thought to be titled G.I. Joe: Cobra Strikes, which was later denied by Reese. Stephen Sommers was originally going to return as director of the sequel, but Paramount Pictures announced in February 2011 that Jon Chu would direct the sequel. In July 2011, the sequel's name was revealed to be G.I. Joe: Retaliation. Chu would later declare that Paramount wanted a reboot that also served as a sequel to The Rise of Cobra since "a lot of people saw the first movie so we don't want to alienate that and redo the whole thing."

Reboot

Snake Eyes: G.I. Joe Origins (2021) 

In May 2018, Paramount announced a film centered on Snake Eyes, with Evan Spiliotopoulos hired to write the script. In December, Robert Schwentke signed on as director with principal photography scheduled to take place in Japan, Vancouver, British Columbia in Canada and Los Angeles, California. Ray Park was later reported to not reprise the role, as the film deals with the character's origin story. By August 2019, Henry Golding was cast as Snake Eyes, while Andrew Koji was set to portray Storm Shadow, replacing Lee Byung-hun, who portrayed the character in previous films. Kimani Ray Smith was hired as Stunt Coordinator on the project. In September 2019, Iko Uwais entered negotiations to portray Hard Master, while Úrsula Corberó was cast as Anastasia Cisarovna / Baroness (replacing Sienna Miller, who played the character in G.I. Joe: The Rise of Cobra). James Madigan was hired as the Second-Unit Director, after previously working on G.I. Joe: Retaliation. By October 2019, Samara Weaving was cast as Shana O'Hara / Scarlett (replacing Rachel Nichols, who previously portrayed the character in G.I. Joe: The Rise of the Cobra), while Takehiro Hira, Haruka Abe and Steven Allerick were cast in an undisclosed roles.

The film was scheduled for an October 23, 2020 release date, and was delayed to July 23, 2021 due to the COVID-19 pandemic.

Future

G.I. Joe: Ever Vigilant (2024) 

In April 2013, a third G.I. Joe film was announced, with the studio looking at the potential for it to be released in 3D format. Chu was initially hired to return to direct the third film, though the filmmaker left the project in favor of directing Jem and the Holograms instead. Producer di Bonaventura expressed interest in having Johnson and Willis reprise their respective roles, while announcing a third primary role. By September of the same year, Evan Daugherty was hired as screenwriter. The film was initially scheduled for a 2016 release, though this changed when di Bonaventura revealed that the studio was in search of a new director.

By July 2014, Jonathan Lemkin was hired to contribute to the script, with a plot that will focus on Roadblock. Johnson signed on to return as the star of the film. The story will incorporate M.A.S.K. character Matt Trakker, and the villainous twins Tomax Paoli and Xamot Paoli. In April 2015, the studio hired D. J. Caruso as director, with Aaron Berg hired to do a re-write of the previous draft of the script. In January 2017, Caruso revealed that a previous draft of the script ended with the introduction of the Transformers. This was not approved by Paramount Pictures, who as a studio were "not ready...yet". In May, Dwayne Johnson stated that he would appear in any future G.I. Joe film, and that he hopes to be a part of the franchise expansion.

In May 2018, the film was titled G.I. Joe: Ever Vigilant, with Josh Appelbaum and André Nemec signed on as co-screenwriters. Johnson is again in early negotiations to reprise his role, with the plot centering around his character leading a new team of Joes. That team features Daina Janack, Dr. Adele Burkhart, Wild Bill, Barbecue, General Flagg, Doc, and Keel-Haul; the primary antagonists are Tomax and Xamot. Cobra Commander has a smaller role. The film was scheduled to be released on March 27, 2020, until Snake Eyes took precedence and was given that release date. Due to the COVID-19 pandemic, the intended October 23, 2020 release of Snake Eyes was delayed, also delaying Ever Vigilant development. In May 2021, producer Lorenzo di Bonaventura revealed that there are multiple scripts for the sequel in development.

Other projects in development 
In March 2013, producer Lorenzo di Bonaventura announced that he would be interested in producing a G.I. Joe / Transformers crossover film. By July, G.I. Joe: Retaliation director Jon M. Chu stated that he is interested in directing the movie. In June 2014, di Bonaventura cast doubt on the project, while acknowledging that it is an ongoing possibility. The Transformers were initially written to be introduced at the end of G.I. Joe 3, but Paramount decided against this. In July 2021, while stating that Paramount Pictures has been hesitant to green-light production on the crossover, di Bonneventura declared that the project is "inevitable" and Golding did have an expression on doing the crossover film.

In November 2015, Paramount Pictures announced that the G.I. Joe series would feature further installments in the future with Akiva Goldsman creating a writers room of screenwriters to determine future projects. In August 2019, Paramount announced a spin-off film which will include Philip "Chuckles" Provost was in development. After completing the script for G.I. Joe: Ever Vigilant, Josh Appelbaum and André Nemec were hired as co-screenwriters.

In May 2020, a followup film to Snake Eyes: G.I. Joe Origins was announced to be in development, with a script co-written by Joe Shrapnel and Anna Waterhouse. Henry Golding will reprise his role as Snake Eyes. Lorenzo di Bonaventura will return as producer, while the project will be a joint-venture production between Paramount Pictures, Metro-Goldwyn-Mayer, Entertainment One, and Di Bonaventura Pictures.

Canceled shared universe 
In December 2015, both Hasbro and Paramount were creating a cinematic universe, combining G.I. Joe with films based on Micronauts, Visionaries: Knights of the Magical Light, M.A.S.K., and Rom. In April 2016, The Hollywood Reporter stated that Michael Chabon, Brian K. Vaughan, Nicole Perlman, Lindsey Beer, Cheo Coker, John Francis Daley & Jonathan Goldstein, Joe Robert Cole, Jeff Pinkner, Nicole Riegel, and Geneva Robertson-Dworet became its writers. In January 2017, Caruso stated that the script for the crossover movie was being written. In October 2015, Jon M. Chu restated his intentions to create a film that includes Transformers, G.I. Joe, and Jem. In May 2021, di Bonaventura stated that the writers room that was created for the plans to implement a shared universe of Hasbro intellectual properties failed and would not move forward.

Short films

G.I. Joe: The Invasion of Cobra Island - Part 1 (2009) 
In 2009 to promote The Rise of Cobra 2 short stop-motion films were created.

G.I. Joe: The Invasion of Cobra Island - Part 2 (2009) 
A sequel to G.I. Joe: The Invasion of Cobra Island - Part 1.

Snake Eyes Has Something to Say… G.I. Joe Origins (2021) 
To promote Snake Eyes Paramout did 3rd stop motion short film in the franchise and uploaded it on their YouTube channel.

Morning Light: A Weapon With Stories To  Tell (2021) 
Every Blu-ray release of Snake Eyes came with animated prequel short film in the form of motion comic telling the story of Morning Light the sword Snake Eyes uses.

Television
In February 2021, a spin-off streaming television series centered around Alison Hart-Burnett / Lady Jaye was announced to be in development. It is an expansion of the G.I. Joe film series as an Amazon Prime Video exclusive. Erik Oleson will serve as showrunner, series creator, and executive producer for the show, while Lorenzo di Benaventura will serve as co-executive producer. The series is a joint-venture production between Paramount Television Studios, eOne, Skydance Television, and Amazon Original Series.

Main cast and characters

Reception

Box office performance

Critical and public response

Other media

Comics
In addition to the films, various comic books were presented by IDW Publishing:
 G.I. Joe Movie Prequel (March – June 2009)
 G.I. Joe Movie Adaptation (July 2009)
 Snake Eyes (October 2009 – January 2010)
 G.I. Joe: Operation HISS (February – June 2010)
 G.I. Joe: Retaliation Movie Prequel (February – April 2012)

Video games
 G.I. Joe: The Rise of Cobra (August 4, 2009)

See also
  Transformers film series

References

External links
 

Action film series
Film series introduced in 2009
Science fiction film series
G.I. Joe (film series)
Paramount Pictures franchises
Metro-Goldwyn-Mayer franchises
Film series based on comics